Jürgen "Ventor" Reil (born 26 June 1966) is a German musician, best known as the drummer for German thrash metal band Kreator. He is one of the only two original members left in the band, although he has left "at least twice" due to personal differences.

Reil plays the double bass drum style prevalent in thrash and death metal. He also sang lead vocals on a few songs on the band's earlier albums, and still does live (notably "Riot of Violence").

He is a big fan of tattoo art and he owns his own tattoo studio in Essen-Karnap (Kreativ-Tattoo), in which he actively works as a tattooer.

Discography
Endless Pain (1985)
Pleasure to Kill (1986)
Terrible Certainty (1987)
Extreme Aggression (1989)
Coma of Souls (1990)
Renewal (1992)
Outcast (1997)
Endorama (1999)
Violent Revolution (2001)
Enemy of God (2005)
Hordes of Chaos (2009)
Phantom Antichrist (2012)
Gods of Violence (2017)
Hate Über Alles (2022)

References

1966 births
German drummers
German heavy metal drummers
German heavy metal musicians
German male musicians
German tattoo artists
Kreator members
Living people
Male drummers